Feng Yun (born February 23, 1976) is a female Chinese hurdler.

Her personal best time is 12.85 seconds, achieved during the heats at the 1999 World Championships in Seville.

Competition record

References

1976 births
Living people
Athletes (track and field) at the 2000 Summer Olympics
Chinese female hurdlers
Olympic athletes of China
Asian Games medalists in athletics (track and field)
Athletes (track and field) at the 2002 Asian Games
Athletes (track and field) at the 2006 Asian Games
Universiade medalists in athletics (track and field)
Asian Games gold medalists for China
Asian Games silver medalists for China
Medalists at the 2002 Asian Games
Medalists at the 2006 Asian Games
Universiade silver medalists for China
Runners from Guangdong
Medalists at the 1997 Summer Universiade